Chaparral High School may refer to:

Chaparral High School (Arizona)
Chaparral High School (Colorado)
Chaparral High School (Kansas)
Chaparral High School (Nevada)
Chaparral High School (El Cajon, California)
Chaparral High School (Temecula, California)
Chaparral High School (Ojai, California), Ojai, California
Chaparral High School (Phelan, California)